Abraham Nott (February 5, 1768June 19, 1830) was a United States representative from South Carolina and a slaveholder. Born in Saybrook in the Connecticut Colony, he was educated in early life by a private teacher. He graduated from Yale College in 1787 and in 1788 moved to McIntosh County, Georgia, where he became a private tutor for one year. He moved to Camden, South Carolina, in 1789. He studied law, was admitted to the bar in 1791, beginning to practice in Union, South Carolina. He was a member of South Carolina House of Representatives from 1796 to 1797, and was elected as a Federalist to the Sixth United States Congress, serving from March 4, 1799, to March 3, 1801. After leaving Congress, he resumed practicing law in Columbia in 1804, and was elected a member of the board of trustees of the University of South Carolina in 1805. He was Intendant of Columbia in 1807, and was elected judge of the South Carolina Circuit Court in 1810. He was president of the South Carolina Court of Appeals in 1824 and continued serving as a judge until his death.

Nott died in Fairfield County, South Carolina and is interred in the First Presbyterian Churchyard, Columbia.
He was the father of Josiah C. Nott.

References

External links

1768 births
1830 deaths
Burials in South Carolina
Members of the South Carolina House of Representatives
People from Deep River, Connecticut
South Carolina state court judges
Federalist Party members of the United States House of Representatives from South Carolina
Yale College alumni